Begay is a surname, derived from the Navajo word   meaning "his/her son". It is also a Senegambian first name, spelled the same way in English speaking Gambia but pronounced bee gaay (long stretch).

Begay may also refer to:

 Apie Begay, Navajo painter
 Arthur C. Begay (1932-2010), Navajo painter
 Carlyle Begay, Arizona State Senator
 D.Y. Begay (born 1953), Navajo textile artist
 Edward T. Begay, politician
 Fred Begay (born 1932), nuclear physicist
 Harrison Begay (1914 or 1917-2012), artist
 Jerry C. Begay (1924–2008), soldier 
 Keats Begay (1923-1987), Navajo painter
 Notah Begay III (born 1972), professional golfer
 Shonto Begay (born 1954), Navajo artist
 Joyce Begay-Foss, Navajo weaver

See also
 Begaye
 Begay v. United States
 Notah Begay III Foundation Challenge

References

Native American surnames